Swift is an unincorporated community in Baldwin County, Alabama, United States.

History
A post office operated under the name Swift from 1882 to 1912.

References

Unincorporated communities in Baldwin County, Alabama
Unincorporated communities in Alabama